Ballet Deviare was founded in 2003 and is located in New York City. It is the brainchild of Laura Kowalewski and Andrew Carpenter. It is a truly unique ballet company due to its use of heavy metal music. Classical dance styles are mixed with the music of such bands as Opeth, My Dying Bride, Swallow the Sun, Japanische Kampfhörspiele, and Celestiial. Segments with the band Arsis have been featured on Headbangers Ball.

Their second live production, Forged, was reviewed in Stylus magazine.

References

External links
 

Deviare, Ballet
Dance companies in New York City
2003 establishments in New York City
Performing groups established in 2003